Carol Ross Joynt, author of the 2011 memoir "Innocent Spouse," published by Crown, first excerpted in Vogue, also hosts her own Washington-based long-form cable TV interview program, "The Q&A Cafe," created in 2001, and is currently the Booking Producer for "Face the Nation" at CBS News. Prior to FTN she was with NBC, serving as a Booking Producer for "Meet the Press Daily with Chuck Todd," on MSNBC. FTN is her third time working at CBS News. Over the course of her broadcast career she was a writer for Walter Cronkite on "The CBS Evening News," and a segment producer for Charlie Rose at "Nightwatch," where Charlie and she won the network news Emmy Award for "Best Interview;" she also held producing roles with David Brinkley at "This Week" at ABC News, Ted Koppel, at "Nightline" at ABC News, and Larry King at "Larry King Live" on CNN, and "Hardball" with Chris Matthews at MSNBC; and for its brief two years on the air she was with the syndicated "USA Today: The TV Show" as Washington Bureau Chief and "Life" section producer.

Immediately before joining NBC, Joynt worked in the magazine business. She was with Foreign Policy as Vice President of Communications and supervised staff media training and the launch of FP Podcasts. She came to FP from Washingtonian, where she was Editor-at-Large for three years. She wrote several hundred articles, including the monthly "Behind The Scenes" feature,  and dozens of her photos were published in the magazine. From 2007 to 2016 she also wrote a weekly column about Washington power, money and social life for the New York Social Diary.

Awards  
While a writer for Walter Cronkite at "The CBS Evening News," she won the Writer's Guild Award for "Best News Script" three times for broadcasts pertaining to Watergate and the Vietnam War, an honor shared with her writing colleagues Charles L. West, Rabun Matthews and Sandor M. Polster. The broadcast as a whole won numerous awards for its Watergate coverage, including the Peabody and Dupont.  While a producer for the CBS News "Nightwatch" broadcast, Joynt and host Charlie Rose won the national Emmy Award for "Best Interview" for a one-hour prison interview with Charles Manson, which aired 1987.

Nathans and "Innocent Spouse" 

Carol Joynt's memoir, "Innocent Spouse" chronicles the 12 years she owned and operated Nathans, a popular, even legendary, Georgetown bar and restaurant. Located at the corner of Wisconsin and M Streets, it was founded by her husband, John Howard Joynt III, in 1969. Carol and Howard met in May 1977 and married soon after. Their son, Spencer Ross Joynt, was born in 1991. When Howard died suddenly from pneumonia in February 1997,  Carol was in her fourth year as a producer for Larry King on CNN's "Larry King Live." She set aside her career to oversee the bar, which came with a surprise multimillion-dollar criminal tax fraud case, a constant risk of bankruptcy and a myriad of other harrowing business calamities. Due to the legal mess and a complicated lease she could not sell the bar and had to run it, even though she had no prior restaurant experience. After a more than year-long legal battle, the IRS absolved Carol of any responsibility for the tax fraud, and awarded her "innocent spouse" status. Carol closed Nathans in 2009 and returned to her career in journalism. The Nathans building was sold by its owners to the corporation that includes Under Armour and a mixed-use development was planned to open in 2017. Under Armour later sold to Capital One and in 2019 the building was still vacant.

Carol Joynt's struggle owning Nathans, while also trying to hold on to her television career and raise her son, Spencer, are the threads that run through Innocent Spouse, (Crown Publishers, 2011). Vogue bought exclusive first rights to the book and it was launched with an exclusive "Today" show interview, and a book tour.

The Q&A Cafe 

The Q&A Café, was created  by Carol Joynt at Nathans in October 2001 in response to the September 11 terrorist attacks. The first "talk show in a bar," at the outset the program focused on interviews related to 9/11, terrorism,  and the wars in Iraq and Afghanistan. Washington, D.C. Over the years it evolved to feature a range of interviews with notables and newsmakers from all fields. Carol called upon her extensive background producing talk shows for Charlie Rose, David Brinkley, Ted Koppel, Larry King,  to create The Q&A Café and turn it into a local cable TV show on both the DC Cable Channel and NewsChannel 8. The many notable individuals who appeared for interviews, in a list of more than 400,  include Theodore Sorensen, FedEx Founder Fred Smith, Erica Jong, the cast of "This Is Spinal Tap," Harry Shearer, Michael McKean and Christopher Guest; Ben Bradlee, Sally Quinn and their son Quinn Bradlee; Tim Russert, Julia Reed, Tom Brokaw, Letitia Baldridge, Cokie Roberts, Dan Rather, Gwen Ifill, Tina Brown, Chuck Todd, Jane Lynch, Dr. Anthony Fauci, Valerie Plame, "DC Madame" Deborah Jeanne Palfrey, Andrea Mitchell, Carole Radziwill, Tareq and Michaela Salahi, David Rubenstein, John Riggins, Robert Novak, Art Buchwald, Dan Snyder, George Stephanopoulos, Chris Matthews, Daniel Boulud, Arianna Huffington, David Brooks, Oliver Stone, C.Z Guest, Christopher Hitchens, Susan Isaacs, Sen. Mark Warner, Sen. Fred Thompson, Walter Isaacson, Jack Valenti, Bob Balaban, Bob Schieffer, Sally Bedell Smith, Bob Colcacello, Vernon Jordan, Kitty Kelley, David Baldacci, Carli Fiorina, Hugh Newell Jacobsen, Ted Leonsis, Jonathan Capehart, Christopher Lawford, J. Willard Marriott, Diane Rehm, Bob Woodward, Patrick O'Connell, Shane Harris, Derek Brown, Andrew Sullivan, DC Mayors Marion Barry, Anthony Williams, Adrian Fenty, Vincent Gray and Muriel Bowser; DC Police Chiefs Cathy Lanier and Peter Newsham; Mark Halperin and John Helieman, David Gregory, Mark Shields, Phillipe Cousteau, Robin Givhan, Helen Thomas, Adel Al Jubeir, Tucker Carlson, and Maury Povich and Connie Chung. All the interviews are on YouTube.

A Year Off
After four years writing The CBS Evening News with Walter Cronkite," a period which spanned the Watergate scandal and the fall of Saigon, Carol Joynt took a year off to get off the grid and explore. She traveled across the U.S., and France, and for 7 months lived in the West Indies, crewing as deckhand on"Spartan", a classic Herreshoff New York 50 sailing yacht. When the year was up, Joynt returned to New York, and then Washington, and network news and a succession of positions, which included producing roles at NBC News, CBS News Nightwatch, USA Today the TV Show, This Week with David Brinkley, Nightline, Larry King Live, John Hockenberry, and Hardball with Chris Matthews. For these broadcasts she focused on breaking news and subjects ranging from global politics and the world's leaders to the latest successes or scandals involving the talented, the royal, the celebrated and the infamous.

Film Work 
Joynt directed documentary films and oversaw several other film projects for the National Gallery of Art, working directly with J. Carter Brown. The projects included a retrospective of the NGA's 50th anniversary, and a tribute to the Kress family and their contribution to the Gallery's collections. In 1994 she made a film for the American Academy in Rome, celebrating its 100th anniversary, narrated by Isabella Rosselini.

In February 2011, Carol was diagnosed with early-stage breast cancer.

References

External links

Article from The Washington Post 
Article from Washingtonian Magazine
Interview w/Dan Snyder in Washington Life Magazine
The A-List from WUSA9
Article from The Huffington Post
Article from The Washington Post 
Zagat Guide Listing
Article from The Washington Business Journal

Year of birth missing (living people)
Living people
American women in business
21st-century American women